The Maghreb Champions Cup was a North African football competition organized by the Union Maghrebine de Football (UMF) and which regrouped the winners of the leagues from Algeria, Morocco, Tunisia and Libya (only in the first edition). Mauritania at this time was not a part of the Maghreb, so their clubs did not participate.

Winners 

 A round-robin tournament determined the final standings.

Winners by team

CR Belouizdad (ex. CR Belcourt)
Racing AC Casablanca (ex. ADM Casablanca)

Winners by country

See also
 Maghreb Cup Winners Cup

External links
 Maghreb Champions Cup - rsssf.com

Defunct international club association football competitions in Africa
Maghreb
Football in the Arab world
Sport in North Africa